Robert Joseph McManus (born July 5, 1951) is an American prelate of the Roman Catholic Church who has been bishop of the Diocese of Worcester in Massachusetts since 2004. He was an auxiliary bishop of the Diocese of Providence in Rhode Island from 1999 to 2004.

As bishop in Worcester, McManus had been involved in several public controversies over LGBT rights and reproductive services for women.

Biography

Early life 
Robert McManus was born on July 5, 1951, in Providence, Rhode Island, to Edward and Helen (née King) McManus. He grew up in the Providence area, graduating from Blessed Sacrament School and Our Lady of Providence Seminary high school in Warwick, Rhode Island.

After graduating from high school, McManus entered Catholic University of America in Washington, D.C., obtaining his bachelor and masters degrees.  He then attended the Toronto School of Theology in Toronto, Ontario.  McManus finished in Toronto with a Master of Divinity degree. After his ordination as deacon, McManus served for a year as deacon at Our Lady of Mercy Parish in East Greenwich, Rhode Island,

Priesthood 
On May 27, 1978, McManus was ordained to the priesthood for the Diocese of Providence by Bishop Kenneth Angell. Following his ordination, McManus was assigned as temporary assistant chaplain at Saint Joseph's Hospital in Providence as well as associate pastor at St. Matthew Parish in Cranston, Rhode Island. He was moved in 1981 to serve as associate pastor at St. Anthony Parish in Providence. McManus also fulfilled the role of Catholic chaplain at the Community College of Rhode Island (CCRI) during this period.

In 1984, McManus was sent to study in Rome, where he earned a licentiate and Doctor of Sacred Theology degree from the Pontifical Gregorian University. In November 1987, McManus returned to Rhode Island, now serving as diocesan vicar for education and director of the office of ministerial formation.  In July 1987, he was appointed pastor of St. Luke Parish in Barrington, Rhode Island. In 1990, McManus also became consultant and editorial writer for The Providence Visitor newspaper.

McManus was elevated to the title of monsignor on February 28, 1997 by Pope John Paul II. In June 1998, McManus left St. Luke to become rector of Our Lady of Providence Seminary, while providing pastoral coverage at St. Margaret Parish in Rumford, Rhode Island.

Auxiliary Bishop of Providence 
On December 1, 1998, John Paul II appointed McManus as auxiliary bishop of the Diocese of Providence and titular bishop of Allegheny.  He was consecrated on February 22, 1999, by Bishop Robert Mulvee at the Cathedral of Saints Peter and Paul in Providence. As auxiliary bishop, McManus continued as rector at Our Lady and secretary for ministerial formation.

Bishop of Worcester 
On March 9, 2004,  John Paul II appointed McManus as bishop of the Diocese of Worcester.  He was installed on May 14, 2004, succeeding Bishop Daniel P. Reilly, who retired.

McManus criticized the College of the Holy Cross in Worcester for renting out "sacred space" to the Massachusetts Alliance on Teen Pregnancy for workshops. He said that the Alliance taught subjects that violated the teachings of the Catholic Church. On October 10, 2007, he issued a statement making known his criticisms of the conference. and stated that the college might lose its designation as a Catholic institution. Holy Cross President Michael C. McFarland said that the college had contractual obligations to the Alliance and would not cancel its agreement.

In April 2012, McManus asked Anna Maria College in Paxton, Massachusetts, to rescind an invitation to Victoria Kennedy to speak at its commencement ceremony, citing her views on abortion rights for women and same sex marriage. On May 4, 2012, the college agreed to disinvite Kennedy, but also rescinded its commencement invitation to McManus, stating that his presence at the ceremony would be a "distraction".

On August 25, 2020, Pope Francis appointed McManus apostolic administrator for the Diocese of Springfield in Massachusetts while continuing as bishop of Worcester. The diocese became "vacant" with the appointment of Bishop Mitchell T. Rozanski as archbishop of St. Louis. McManus' term as apostolic administrator ended on December 14, 2020, with the installation of a new bishop in Springfield.

On October 1, 2020, McManus and the Diocese of Worcester were named in a sexual abuse lawsuit filed by a former parishioner. The plaintiff alleged that Thomas E. Mahoney, a diocesan priest, had groomed and abused him and other boys in the early 1970s at various locations in Worcester and Boylston, Massachusetts. The lawsuit accused the diocese of failing to stop Mahoney's alleged crimes. After the lawsuit was filed, McManus suspended Mahoney, who had already retired, from any ministerial duties.

Disputed property sale 
In June 2012, diocesan officials declined to sell Oakhurst, an historic mansion in Northbridge, Massachusetts, to James Fairbanks and Alain Beret, a married gay couple. The mansion had been used as a Church-affiliated nonprofit retreat center. In September 2012, the couple sued McManus and the diocese for discrimination, citing an email in which church officials said that McManus wanted to stop the sale "because of the potentiality of gay marriages there."  On October 12, 2012, the diocese sold the property to a different buyer.

A diocese lawyer claimed that the Massachusetts anti-discrimination statute provides an exemption for religious institutions. He said: "If a religious entity did not have to permit property to be used for gay weddings, which we all agree, why must religious property be sold to an organization if it is going to be used for a gay wedding?"  In March 2014, Massachusetts Attorney General Martha Coakley filed a legal brief supporting the plaintiffs that said "we believe that this family was unfairly discriminated against by the diocese when it refused to sell them property based on their sexual orientation.... And no reasonable person would think that a wedding that took place on a property no longer owned by a church was endorsed by that church." Oral arguments in the case were scheduled in Worcester Superior Court on April 22, 2014.

DUI arrest 
McManus was arrested on May 4, 2013, in Narragansett, Rhode Island for drunken driving, leaving the scene of an accident, and refusing a chemical sobriety test. At 10:30 pm, McManus had been involved in a crash with another vehicle, then fled the scene.  The other driver followed him and called the police.  They arrested McManus 20 minutes later at his family home in Narragansett. He later stated: 
I made a terrible error in judgment by driving after having consumed alcohol with dinner. There is no excuse for the mistake I made, only a commitment to make amends and accept the consequences of my action. More importantly, I ask forgiveness from the good people whom I serve, as well as my family and friends, in the Diocese of Worcester and the Diocese of Providence.

Black Lives Matter and Pride controversy 
On April 3, 2022, McManus asked the Nativity School of Worcester, a Jesuit-managed middle school in Worcester, Massachusetts, to remove the Black Lives Matter and gay pride flags from their flagpole, saying that they raised confusion about church teachings.  McManus threatened to remove the school's designation as a Catholic school if it did not comply. The Nativity School administration refused to remove the flags. 

On April 9, 2022, McManus announced that he would not be attending the Holy Cross College commencement ceremony.   An online petition at the college denouncing McManus' actions against Nativity School and accusing him of bigotry gained hundreds of signatures.

In June 2022, McManus proclaimed that Nativity School could no longer call itself "Catholic". In response, Nativity School noted that Pope Francis has "praised the outreach and inclusion of LGBTQ+ people" and that the United States Conference of Catholic Bishops "supports the spirit and movement" of Black Lives Matter. Nativity School said it would appeal McManus' declaration to the Vatican and continue flying the two flags.

References

External links

Roman Catholic Diocese of Worcester Official Site
Biography on Diocesan website
 Robert Joseph McManus profile, catholic-hierarchy.org

1951 births
Living people
Clergy from Providence, Rhode Island
Roman Catholic bishops of Worcester, Massachusetts
Roman Catholic Diocese of Providence
Religion in Worcester County, Massachusetts
21st-century Roman Catholic bishops in the United States
Catholic University of America alumni
Religious leaders from Rhode Island